The 2001–2002 FIG Artistic Gymnastics World Cup series was a series of stages where events in men's and women's artistic gymnastics were contested. The series was a two-year long competition culminating at a final event, the World Cup Final in 2002. A number of qualifier stages were held. The top 3 gymnast in each apparatus at the qualifier events would receive medals and prize money. Gymnasts who finished in the top 8 would also receive points that would be added up to a ranking which would qualify individual gymnasts for the biennial World Cup Final.

Stages
Besides specific World Cup stages, the 2001 World Championships was also part of the 2001–2002 World Cup series.

Medalists

Men

Women

Medal table

Overall

Men

Women

See also
 2001–2002 FIG Rhythmic Gymnastics World Cup series

References

Artistic Gymnastics World Cup
2001 in gymnastics
2002 in gymnastics